Kabeli may refer to:
Kabeli, Lääne County, a village in Martna Parish, Lääne County, Estonia
Kabeli, Lääne-Viru County, a village in Viru-Nigula Parish, Lääne-Viru County, Estonia
Kabeli, Hormozgan, a village in Iran
Kabeli River, in Nepal